Nerokouros is a village in Crete, in the regional unit of Chania.

References

Populated places in Chania (regional unit)